The St. John's Rugby Football Club was a Canadian football team in Winnipeg, Manitoba, formed in October 1887, that played in the Manitoba Rugby Football Union and Western Canada Rugby Football Union between 1892 and 1932. The team was founded by students of St. John's College, but as information about this team has been mostly lost to history, it seems that the football team was not officially associated with the college (as mention of the team is not found in any of the school's official history). Additionally, there was also a St. John's Royalists junior football team, but again, no information links it to the MRFU club.

The St. John's Rugby Football Club was a very successful team, having won 13 MRFU championships in the 31 seasons they played.

While the St. John's Rugby Football Club did merge with new Winnipeg Rugby Football Club in 1932, the team is not part of the official history or records of Winnipeg's current team: the Blue Bombers.

MRFU season-by-season

References

Defunct Canadian football teams
s
Sports clubs established in 1892
Sports clubs disestablished in 1932
1892 establishments in Manitoba
1932 disestablishments in Manitoba